On 11 February 2023 at night, a man shot seven people with a shotgun in a bowling alley in Fafe, Braga District, Portugal

Shooting 
The perpetrator, a man about 40 years old, had a discussion with another customer, during which the security team kicked him out of the establishment after he made the payment. At that time he threatened that he had a gun in his car. About 30 minutes later he came back with a shotgun but the staff tried to stop him. During the confusion the firearm was fired against a glass door, causing shrapnel to hit seven people.

Four people, two male and two female, required hospital support and were transported to the
Senhora da Oliveira Hospital, in Guimarães. One of them is the doorman.

The gunman fled the scene but was identified by video surveillance cameras. He was then retained by security and detained by the GNR. He ended up being taken to the hospital because he felt sick. He will be present to the Investigating Judge when he is discharged from the hospital.

References 

2023 mass shootings in Europe
Mass shootings in Portugal
February 2023 crimes in Europe
Non-fatal shootings